The Rainbow Bar and Grill is a bar, restaurant and grocery store on the Sunset Strip in West Hollywood, California, United States, adjacent to the border of Beverly Hills, California. Its address is 9015 Sunset Boulevard.

The bottom level of the building is the restaurant, The Rainbow Bar and Grill. Upstairs is an exclusive club called "Over the Rainbow", which consists of a full bar, a dance floor, and a DJ booth. The restaurant is next to The Roxy Theatre and 1 OAK; formerly Gazzarri's, Billboard Live, and The Key Club.

History
The restaurant was founded in early 1972 by Gary Stromberg and Bob Gibson, heads of the PR firm Gibson & Stromberg. They brought in co-owners Elmer Valentine, Lou Adler, Mario Maglieri and others, opening on April 16, 1972, with a party for Elton John. At the time, the word "rainbow" signified peace and freedom. It quickly became known as a hangout for celebrities of all types. John Belushi ate his last meal (lentil soup) at table No. 16. The pornography actor Ron Jeremy was also known to regularly hang out there in the 2000s and 2010s.
For many years, the owner was Mario Maglieri.

Before becoming the Rainbow, the restaurant was the Villa Nova restaurant, which was originally owned by film director Vincente Minnelli, at the time married to Judy Garland. Joe DiMaggio and Marilyn Monroe met at the restaurant on a blind date in 1952.

After operating for 28 years, Villa Nova closed in 1968 and the building re-opened as the Windjammer until it closed in 1971.

The Rainbow became known as a hangout for rock musicians and their groupies. Notable regulars at the Rainbow in this period include Keith Moon, Alice Cooper, Micky Dolenz, Harry Nilsson, John Lennon, Ringo Starr, and Neil Diamond. Elvis Presley and Johnny Cash were known to have occasionally visited the Rainbow. The group of musicians calling themselves the Hollywood Vampires made the Rainbow their home away from home in the mid-1970s. In the last two decades of his life, Motörhead frontman Lemmy was a daily fixture at the Rainbow whenever the band was not on tour, and often played a video poker machine at the end of the bar table.

Producer Kim Fowley used to hang out at the Rainbow, especially in 1975, when he formed the all-girl group The Runaways. Actress and musician Cheryl Smith was given her pseudonym Rainbeaux Smith early in her career as a result of her frequenting the Rainbow; she briefly replaced Sandy West as drummer of The Runaways at the end of that band's existence.

As musical trends on the Strip changed towards heavy metal in the 1980s, the Rainbow followed suit. Members of Mötley Crüe, Poison, and Guns N' Roses frequented the bar. It was mentioned in a number of songs, such as "Sunset and Babylon" by W.A.S.P., "Vampire" by L.A. Guns and "Peach Kelli Pop" by Redd Kross, and featured in the videos of "November Rain", "Estranged" and "Don't Cry" by Guns N' Roses and also, although briefly, "Rock Out" and "Stone Deaf in the U.S.A" by Motörhead.

Anthony Kiedis of the Red Hot Chili Peppers noted in his book Scar Tissue that he often sat with his father, Blackie Dammett, at the club along with members of bands such as Led Zeppelin and Kiss. Often the waitresses and bartenders were groupies as well as those who frequented the establishment. In Pamela Des Barres' book Let's Spend the Night Together, the author commented that as a barfly in the early 1980s she met a number of celebrities including Billy Idol.

In June 2016, the Rainbow started having live music every Wednesday night from 10 pm until closing. Various musicians would host the live jam every week. Local acts, as well as different well known musicians, would show up to perform random classic rock cover songs every week. During this time, there were many jam band gatherings being established on Sunset Boulevard around the area. Viper Room and The Whisky a Go Go also joined the Rainbow by allowing musicians to host jams on various week nights.

On January 18, 2017, the Rainbow was inducted into the Hall of Heavy Metal History for introducing the world to new heavy metal acts.

In popular culture
 Los Angeles songwriter Warren Zevon referenced the scene at the Rainbow in the last verse of his 1976 song "Poor Poor Pitiful Me".
 The musical group Rainbow was named after this club.
 The bar is featured in the Guns N' Roses videos for "November Rain" and in "Estranged".
 The Great White video for "Angel song" also features the bar.
 The track "Rainbow Bar & Grill" from the Cheech & Chong album Let's Make a New Dope Deal takes place in the bar and restaurant.
 Original YES guitarist Peter Banks recorded a track with his later band Empire called "Somewhere Over the Rainbow Bar and Grill".
 The Rainbow is featured in the 2017 fantasy novel The Road To Roo Inn by Morat.
 Fragrance company 19-69 released a perfume named after the Rainbow Bar in 2018.
 It features in the 2018 Netflix original film The Dirt, the story behind Mötley Crüe.
 The Jimmy Buffett song "You'll Never Work In This Bidness Again" references the Rainbow in the line of the bridge, "I parked cars at the Rainbow, I sold maps of the stars...".
 The 2020 single "Somewhere Over the Rainbow Bar and Grill" from David Lee Roth references the club.
 The 2022 single "Fallin' With Me" by The Struts contains the lyric "Meet at the Rainbow, 9:45" in the chorus.
 It features in the beginning of the music video “Murder One” by Metallica.
 A documentary entitled "The Rainbow" directed by Zak Knutson, was released in 2019.

See also

 Sunset Strip
 The Roxy Theatre
 The Troubadour
 Whisky a Go Go
 Gazzari's
 Viper Room
 Motörhead

References

Bibliography

External links
 Homepage

1972 establishments in California
Buildings and structures in West Hollywood, California
Drinking establishments in California
Restaurants established in 1972
Restaurants in Los Angeles